Victor Churchill is an Australian butcher. It was founded in 1876 in Woollahra, New South Wales by Victor Churchill and is Australia’s oldest continually run butcher shop.

See also

List of butcher shops
List of oldest companies in Australia

References

External links

Australian companies established in 1876
Meat processing in Australia
Manufacturing companies based in Sydney
Butcher shops
Shops in Australia